TM-28 was a Soyuz mission to the Mir space station.

Crew

Mission Accomplishments
Docked with Mir.
Baturin became the first Russian politician in space.
Padalka and Avdeyev performed an EVA on 15.09.1998 (30 m) into the module Spektr (new cables connected for solar structures).

Notes
Padalka and Avdeyev became 26th resident crew of Mir.
Baturin landed on August 25, 1998 (5:22 UT) with Soyuz TM-27.
Avdeyev landed on August 28, 1999 (0:41 UT) with Soyuz TM-29.

References

Crewed Soyuz missions
Spacecraft launched in 1998